James Taylor Lewis (October 30, 1819August 5, 1904) was an American lawyer and politician who served as the 9th Governor of Wisconsin (1864–1866). Prior to his election as governor, he was the 7th Secretary of State of Wisconsin (1862–1864) and the 4th Lieutenant Governor of Wisconsin (1854–1856), and served one year each in the Wisconsin State Senate (1853) and Assembly (1852).

Early life
Lewis was born in Clarendon in Orleans County, New York, to Shubael Lewis and his first wife, Eleanor (née Robertson). His father was a farmer and colonel in the New York State militia, and came to own large estates in New York and Wisconsin Territory. James Lewis was the third of four sons, his brothers were William L. Lewis, Shubael R. Lewis, and Hiram W. Lewis. His mother died in 1834, and his father's second wife, Parna Nichols, assisted in raising him.

He received a common school education and completed a course of English and classical study at Clarkson Academy and Clinton Seminary. He was interested from an early age in military affairs, and participated in the New York Militia. He was made a sergeant in 1838, and, in 1840, was made a lieutenant in the 215th Regiment. In 1842, he began studying law at Clarkson, New York, under Henry R. Selden, who later became Lieutenant Governor of New York. After completing his studies, he was offered a legal partnership in Clinton, New York, but declined. He instead chose to move west to the Wisconsin Territory and established himself at Columbus, which remained his principal residence for the rest of his life.

Career
He taught school briefly in the district schools around Clarkson. In 1842, he began the study of law with former New York lieutenant governor Henry R. Selden. In 1845 he moved to what is now Columbus, Wisconsin, where he was admitted to the bar.

Between 1846 and 1852, Lewis held the positions of district attorney and county judge and was elected to terms in both the Wisconsin State Assembly and the State Senate. He was also a member or the Wisconsin Constitutional Convention of 1847–1848, representing Columbia County. Lewis was a member of the Independent Order of Odd Fellows in Columbus (Columbia Lodge #40) and served as Noble Grand of the Lodge in 1851. He also served as the fourth Lieutenant Governor of Wisconsin from 1854 to 1856, Wisconsin secretary of state from 1862 to 1864.

Nominated by the Union Republicans for governor, Lewis was elected and served as Governor of Wisconsin from January 6, 1864, until January 5, 1866. He was the last Wisconsin governor to hold the office during the Civil War. and was concerned during his tenure with providing sufficient troops for the Civil War and helping to protect them and their dependents. He visited troops in the field and helped establish hospitals in Wisconsin for the care of the wounded. Refusing renomination in 1865, he was offered a diplomatic post by President Lincoln, but chose instead to return to his law practice in Columbus.

Death and legacy
Lewis died in Columbus, Wisconsin, on August 4, 1904. He is interred at Hillside Cemetery, Columbus, Columbia County, Wisconsin. His former home, now known as the Gov. James T. Lewis House, is listed on the National Register of Historic Places.

Family life
Lewis married Orlina M. Sturgis, of Clarkson, New York, in 1845. They had four children together, though their first son died in infancy. He named his second son Selden, in honor of his law instructor, Henry R. Selden. His third son, Charles, was named for Charles D. Robinson.

His elder brother, Shubael R. Lewis, won esteem at the Battle of Chapultepec in the Mexican–American War.

References

External links
 National Governors Association
 

|-

1819 births
1904 deaths
District attorneys in Wisconsin
Republican Party governors of Wisconsin
Lieutenant Governors of Wisconsin
Republican Party members of the Wisconsin State Assembly
People from Clarendon, New York
People of Wisconsin in the American Civil War
Wisconsin state court judges
Republican Party Wisconsin state senators
Secretaries of State of Wisconsin
People from Columbus, Wisconsin
Union (American Civil War) state governors
Burials in Wisconsin
19th-century American judges